Wasita (al-Wasīṭâ) is a Basic People's Congress administrative division of Bayda, Libya. Wasita is located about 5 km north of Bayda. The proportion of low-density population in Wasita, because it is considered an agricultural area and the lush trees and natural reserves.

References

See also 
 List of cities in Libya

Basic People's Congress divisions of Bayda
Populated places in Jabal al Akhdar